Illia Charheika (born 15 April 1993) is a Belarusian sports shooter. He competed in the Men's 10 metre air rifle event at the 2012 Summer Olympics.

References

External links

1993 births
Living people
Belarusian male sport shooters
Olympic shooters of Belarus
Shooters at the 2010 Summer Youth Olympics
Shooters at the 2012 Summer Olympics
Shooters at the 2016 Summer Olympics
Sportspeople from Minsk
European Games competitors for Belarus
Shooters at the 2015 European Games
ISSF rifle shooters
Shooters at the 2019 European Games
21st-century Belarusian people